Osiny may refer to:

Osiny, Bełchatów County in Łódź Voivodeship (central Poland)
Osiny, Brzeziny County in Łódź Voivodeship (central Poland)
Osiny, Łask County in Łódź Voivodeship (central Poland)
Osiny, Łowicz County in Łódź Voivodeship (central Poland)
Osiny, Łuków County in Lublin Voivodeship (east Poland)
Osiny, Gmina Chodel in Lublin Voivodeship (east Poland)
Osiny, Puławy County in Lublin Voivodeship (east Poland)
Osiny, Kielce County in Świętokrzyskie Voivodeship (south-central Poland)
Osiny, Starachowice County in Świętokrzyskie Voivodeship (south-central Poland)
Osiny, Włoszczowa County in Świętokrzyskie Voivodeship (south-central Poland)
Osiny, Gostynin County in Masovian Voivodeship (east-central Poland)
Osiny, Grodzisk Mazowiecki County in Masovian Voivodeship (east-central Poland)
Osiny, Grójec County in Masovian Voivodeship (east-central Poland)
Osiny, Mińsk County in Masovian Voivodeship (east-central Poland)
Osiny, Siedlce County in Masovian Voivodeship (east-central Poland)
Osiny, Wyszków County in Masovian Voivodeship (east-central Poland)
Osiny, Zwoleń County in Masovian Voivodeship (east-central Poland)
Osiny, Kępno County in Greater Poland Voivodeship (west-central Poland)
Osiny, Słupca County in Greater Poland Voivodeship (west-central Poland)
Osiny, Częstochowa County in Silesian Voivodeship (south Poland)
Osiny, Gmina Mykanów in Silesian Voivodeship (south Poland)
Osiny, Wodzisław County in Silesian Voivodeship (south Poland)
Osiny, Opole Voivodeship (south-west Poland)